Prince Shen of the Second Rank (doroi ginggulehe giyūn wang), or simply Prince Shen, was the title of a princely peerage used in China during the Manchu-led Qing dynasty (1636–1912). It was renamed to "Prince Zhi of the Second Rank" in 1772 and upgraded to Prince Zhi of the First Rank (or simply Prince Zhi) in 1789.

Since the peerage was not awarded "iron-cap" status, this meant that each successive bearer of the title would normally start off with a title downgraded by one rank vis-à-vis that held by his predecessor. However, the title would generally not be downgraded to any lower than a feng'en fuguo gong except under special circumstances.

The first bearer of the title was Yunxi (允禧; 1711–1758), the 21st son of the Kangxi Emperor. In 1735, Yunxi was granted the title "Prince Shen of the Second Rank" by his nephew, the Qianlong Emperor. As his two sons died early, Yunxi adopted the Qianlong Emperor's sixth son, Yongrong (1744–1790), as his grandson. Yongrong inherited the peerage in 1772 as "Prince Zhi of the Second Rank" and was promoted to a qinwang (first-rank prince) in 1789. The title was passed down over eight generations and held by eight persons.

Members of the Prince Shen peerage

Main line

 Yunxi (允禧; 1711 – 1758), the Kangxi Emperor's 21st son, initially a beizi (4th-rank prince), promoted to beile (3rd-rank prince), held the title Prince Shen of the Second Rank from 1735 to 1758, posthumously honoured as Prince Shen Jing of the Second Rank (慎靖郡王)
 Hong'ang (弘昴; 1728 – 1742), Yunxi's first son
 Hongxun (弘旬; 1731 – 1749), Yunxi's second son
 (adoption)
 Yongrong (1744 – 1790), the Qianlong Emperor's sixth son and adopted as Yunxi's grandson & heir, initially a beile (3rd-rank prince), promoted to second-rank prince in 1772, held the title Prince Zhi of the First Rank from 1789 to 1790, posthumously honoured as Prince Zhi Zhuang of the First Rank (質莊親王)
 Mianqing (綿慶; 1779 – 1804), Yongrong's fifth son, succeeded & held the title as Prince Zhi of the Second Rank from 1790 to 1804, posthumously honoured as Prince Zhi Ke of the Second Rank (質恪郡王)
 Yiqi (奕綺; 1802 – 1842), Mianqing's eldest son, succeeded & held the title of a beile (3rd-rank prince) from 1809 to 1839, stripped of his title in 1839, posthumously restored of his title in 1842
 Zaihua (載華; 1829 – 1888), Yilun's (from Prince Cheng's peerage & adoptive Prince Lü's peerage) 11th son and adopted as Yiqi's heir & son, succeeded & held the title of a beizi (4th-rank prince) from 1845 to 1865, stripped of his title in 1865
 Putai (溥泰; born 1848), Zaigang's eldest son and adopted as Zaihua's heir & son, initially a first class bulwark general from 1868 to 1882, promoted & succeeded as a grace defender duke in 1882, stripped of his title in 1883
 Puling (溥齡; 1849 – 1897), Zaigang's second son and Putai's younger brother & successor, initially a first class bulwark general from 1872 to 1883, promoted & succeeded as a grace defender duke in 1883
 Yuheng (毓亨; 1875–?), Puling's eldest son, succeeded & held the title of a grace defender duke from 1897

Family tree

|-
|Legend:
|-
|

See also
 Royal and noble ranks of the Qing dynasty

References
 

Qing dynasty princely peerages